Ichthyophis paucidentulus, the Kapahiang caecilian, is a species of amphibian in the family Ichthyophiidae endemic to Indonesia.
Its natural habitats are subtropical or tropical moist lowland forests, rivers, intermittent rivers, plantations, rural gardens, heavily degraded former forest, irrigated land, and seasonally flooded agricultural land.

References

paucidentulus
Amphibians described in 1965
Amphibians of Indonesia
Taxonomy articles created by Polbot